Moravské Bránice (formerly České Bránice) is a municipality and village in Brno-Country District in the South Moravian Region of the Czech Republic. It has about 1,000 inhabitants.

References

External links

Villages in Brno-Country District